Arataki is a neighbourhood of Mount Maunganui Tauranga, in the Bay of Plenty Region of New Zealand's North Island.

Bayfair Shopping Centre is located in Arataki.

Demographics

Arataki had a population of 5,949 at the 2018 New Zealand census, an increase of 333 people (5.9%) since the 2013 census, and an increase of 381 people (6.8%) since the 2006 census. There were 2,211 households, comprising 2,820 males and 3,132 females, giving a sex ratio of 0.9 males per female, with 1,167 people (19.6%) aged under 15 years, 1,101 (18.5%) aged 15 to 29, 2,550 (42.9%) aged 30 to 64, and 1,131 (19.0%) aged 65 or older.

Ethnicities were 80.9% European/Pākehā, 22.2% Māori, 2.9% Pacific peoples, 5.2% Asian, and 2.6% other ethnicities. People may identify with more than one ethnicity.

The percentage of people born overseas was 18.3, compared with 27.1% nationally.

Although some people chose not to answer the census's question about religious affiliation, 53.3% had no religion, 34.9% were Christian, 2.8% had Māori religious beliefs, 0.6% were Hindu, 0.3% were Muslim, 0.8% were Buddhist and 1.8% had other religions.

Of those at least 15 years old, 1,035 (21.6%) people had a bachelor's or higher degree, and 855 (17.9%) people had no formal qualifications. 792 people (16.6%) earned over $70,000 compared to 17.2% nationally. The employment status of those at least 15 was that 2,352 (49.2%) people were employed full-time, 732 (15.3%) were part-time, and 153 (3.2%) were unemployed.

Education

References

Suburbs of Tauranga